The Embassy of the State of Palestine in Yemen is the diplomatic mission of the Palestine in Yemen. It is located in Sana'a.

See also

List of diplomatic missions in Yemen.
List of diplomatic missions of Palestine.

References

Diplomatic missions of the State of Palestine
Diplomatic missions in Yemen
State of Palestine–Yemen relations